James Ironside Davidson (June 18, 1818 – February 15, 1902) was a Scottish-born farmer and political figure in Ontario, Canada. He represented Ontario South in the House of Commons of Canada from 1891 to 1892 as a Liberal member.

He was born in Monquhitten, Aberdeenshire. In 1841, he married Barbara Hendry. Davidson was president of the Ontario Central Agricultural Association for two years. He defeated William Smith in the 1891 federal election; however, his election was declared void and Smith won the 1892 by-election by acclamation.

References 
 
The Canadian parliamentary companion, 1891, AJ Gemmill

External links 
 Balsam & Mt. Zion, Time Present And Time Past: A Pictorial History of Pickering (jpg)

1818 births
1902 deaths
Liberal Party of Canada MPs
Members of the House of Commons of Canada from Ontario